Queen Seonjeong of the Gim clan (Hangul: 선정왕후 김씨, Hanja: 宣靖王后 金氏; d. 17 August 1222), also known as Queen Mother Seonjeong or Queen Mother Jeongseon was a member of the Goryeo royal family. Born as the youngest daughter of Duke Gangneung, a grandson of King Munjong, she became a queen consort through her marriage with her second half cousin once removed, King Sinjong. Her son, King Huijong became king after her husband's abdication. She was one of several Goryeo queens to take their mother's clan name over their father's and eventually became an ancestor of Gongyang. She was the youngest among Queen Janggyeong, Marchioness Daeryeong and Queen Uijeong.

Biography

Early life and marriage
The future Queen Seonjeong was born as the fourth and youngest daughter of Wang On, Duke Gangneung (왕온 강릉공). It was said that from childhood, she had a straight and bright personality, as well as having gentle and quietly behavior. She later changed her clan name to that of her mother's Kim clan, and married Duke Pyeongnyang (평량공, 平諒公), the youngest son of King Injong and Queen Gongye.

Palace life
In 1197, her husband succeeded King Myeongjong as King Sinjong and she then was honoured as a Primary Consort (원비, 元妃). She was reportedly a devoted and virtue wife to Sinjong, whom she advised and assisted in his royal duties, it was said that they two had a good and close relationship each other because of this.

In April 1204, when her husband abdicated and their son, Wang Yeong ascended the throne as the new King, she was made Queen Dowager (왕태후, 王太后; Wangtaehu). King Huijong attempted to kill Choe Chung-heon, the de facto ruler of the nation, and was deposed. Then, her nephew Wang Suk ascended and after that was succeeded by his son, Wang Cheol. At this time, she already existed 18 years in held this position (queen mother).

It was said that she was excellent at weaved since young, even Choe Chungheon (최충헌) deposed Huijong, she endured difficulties and was sober, so there were no any disturbance. But, when Choe died, she always suffered and defended herself by refraining from suffering. As the Queen Mother, she then moved to Gyeongheung Mansion (경흥부, 慶興府) in Jangchu Hall (장추전, 長秋殿). Sometimes, her palace can be Eunggyeong Mansion (응경부, 膺慶府) in Subok Hall (수복전, 綏福殿). Even in a very chaotic situation when Gangjong and Gojong ascended the throne, she was admired by their peoples for showing off her dignified appearance as the eldest in the royal family.

According to Goryeosa, King Gojong raised empress dowager (황태후, 皇太后) to grand empress dowager (태황태후, 太皇太后) in 1123, but it was unclear whether it referred to her (Sinjong's widow) or Queen Wondeok (Gangjong's widow). If it was her, her title would be the Grand Empress Dowager Seonjeong (선정태황태후, 宣靖太皇太后) instead of Empress Dowager Seonjeong (선정황태후, 宣靖皇太后).

Arts
To honour his grandaunt, King Gojong ordered Yi Gyu-bo to write a poem to commemorate her. This poem, "Everything From the Grand Queen Mother" (왕태후 만사) was recorded in the 16th volume of the Dongguk Sangguk Collection and it was said that Seonjeong was given the honorary title of "The Supreme Imperial Mother" (태상황모, 太上皇母) during her lifetime, while her eldest son became "Retired Emperor" (상황, 上皇) and her granddaughter became "Queen Consort" (왕후, 王后). King Gojong praised her effort into the stability of the royal family, rather than getting involved in politics during Goryeo's difficult times.

Death and Posthumous name
The Queen Mother outlived 18 years than her late husband and later on 17 August 1222 (9th year reign of King Gojong), she died and was buried in Jilleung Tomb (진릉, 眞陵), near Gaeseong, North Korea. Then, received her Posthumous name under King Gojong's command:
In October 1253, name Sin-heon (신헌, 信獻) was added to her posthumous name.
The last King of Goryeo, Gongyang, was King Sinjong and Queen Seonjeong's descendant from their 2nd son, Duke Yangyang.

References

External links
Queen Seonjeong on Encykorea .
선정태후 on Doosan Encyclopedia .

Royal consorts of the Goryeo Dynasty
Korean queens consort
Year of birth unknown
1222 deaths